Johannes Maximus Stainer von Pleinfelden (1610–1692) was a Roman Catholic prelate who served as Auxiliary Bishop of Passau (1682–1692).

Biography
Johannes Maximus Stainer von Pleinfelden was born in Bamberg, Germany in 1610 and ordained a priest in 1648. On 7 Dec 1682, he was appointed during the papacy of Pope Innocent XI as Auxiliary Bishop of Passau and Titular Bishop of Selymbria. On 14 Mar 1683, he was consecrated bishop. He served as Auxiliary Bishop of Passau until his death on 15 Oct 1692. While bishop, he was the principal co-consecrator of Sigmund Ignaz von Wolkenstein-Trostburg, Bishop of Chiemsee (1689).

References 

17th-century Roman Catholic bishops in Bavaria
Bishops appointed by Pope Innocent XI
1610 births
1692 deaths